Barry Walch Mynter (September 16, 1936 – May 23, 2020) was an American football coach who served as head football coach at Norwich University and Canisius College.

After graduating from St. Lawrence University in 1958, Mynter spent ten years as an assistant football coach at Norwich University from 1965 to 1974. Mynter was named head football coach at Norwich for the 1975 season. He served sixteen years as Norwich's head coach from 1975 to 1990, compiling a record of 75–78–2. Mynter was elected to the Norwich University Athletics Hall of Fame in 1990.

In 1992, Mynter was named head football coach at Canisius College. His tenure at Canisius  was less successful, however, as he served as head coach at Canisius from 1992 to 1994, compiling a record of 10–19–1. Mynter resigned as head coach at Canisius following the 1994 season, a season in which the Golden Griffins tied the school record for most losses in a season, finishing just 2–8 on the year.

Mynter died on May 23, 2020, at the age of 83.

Head coaching record

References

1936 births
2020 deaths
St. Lawrence University alumni
Canisius Golden Griffins football coaches
Norwich Cadets football coaches
People from Hudson, New York